Canyon Lake is a census-designated place (CDP) in Comal County, Texas, United States. The population was 31,124 at the 2020 census. It is part of the San Antonio Metropolitan Statistical Area.

The Canyon Lake CDP includes a number of small, unincorporated communities surrounding Canyon Lake, including Sattler, Startzville, Canyon City, Cranes Mill, and Hancock. Communities located on the fringes of the CDP are Fischer, Spring Branch, and Smithson Valley.

History
Residential and commercial development of the area began after the completion of Canyon Lake in 1964. By 1980, the population was 100, rising to 9,975 in 1990.

Geography
It is located adjacent to Canyon Lake, from which it gets its name. Please note this set of GPS coordinates do not correspond to a public access location on Canyon Lake. Please click the link to Canyon Lake, (Texas) at the top of the page for that information and see the Recreation section - Public Access subsection.

Demographics

As of the 2020 United States census, there were 31,124 people, 10,062 households, and 7,596 families residing in the CDP.

As of the census of 2000, there were 16,870 people, 6,906 households, and 5,055 families residing in the CDP. The population density was 116.9 people per square mile (45.2/km2). There were 8,693 housing units at an average density of 60.3/sq mi (23.3/km2). The racial makeup of the CDP was 94.86% White, 0.31% African American, 0.57% Native American, 0.18% Asian, 0.03% Pacific Islander, 2.49% from other races, and 1.55% from two or more races. Hispanic or Latino of any race were 9.77% of the population.

There were 6,906 households, out of which 27.0% had children under the age of 18 living with them, 62.0% were married couples living together, 7.5% had a female householder with no husband present, and 26.8% were non-families. 22.0% of all households were made up of individuals, and 8.8% had someone living alone who was 65 years of age or older. The average household size was 2.44 and the average family size was 2.81.

In the CDP, the population was spread out, with 22.4% under the age of 18, 5.4% from 18 to 24, 26.6% from 25 to 44, 28.1% from 45 to 64, and 17.5% who were 65 years of age or older. The median age was 42 years. For every 100 females, there were 98.9 males. For every 100 females age 18 and over, there were 97.3 males.

The median income for a household in the CDP was $42,019, and the median income for a family was $47,500. Males had a median income of $34,575 versus $25,268 for females. The per capita income for the CDP was $21,516. About 5.6% of families and 8.7% of the population were below the poverty line, including 14.4% of those under age 18 and 4.8% of those age 65 or over.

Education
Canyon Lake is served by the Comal Independent School District.

Zoned schools:
 Bill Brown, Mountain Valley, Rebecca Creek, and Startzville elementaries
 Most residents are zoned to Mountain Valley Middle School while a few are zoned to Smithson Valley Middle School
 Most residents are zoned to Canyon Lake High School while a few are zoned to Smithson Valley High School

Canyon Lake Gorge
On October 7, 2007, the Guadalupe-Blanco River Authority opened the  Canyon Lake Gorge, under a lease from the Army Corps of Engineers, with limited public tours. The 3-hour tours are booked 6 months in advance.

Climate
The climate in this area is characterized by hot, humid summers and generally mild to cool winters. According to the Köppen Climate Classification system, Canyon Lake has a humid subtropical climate, abbreviated "Cfa" on climate maps.

References

External links 
 Community online bulletin board
 Chamber of Commerce for Canyon Lake
 Canyon Lake Visitors Guide

Census-designated places in Comal County, Texas
Census-designated places in Texas
Greater San Antonio
Populated places on the Guadalupe River (Texas)